Simona Waltert (born 13 December 2000) is a Swiss tennis player.

Waltert has career-high WTA rankings of 118 in singles, achieved on 12 September 2022, and 180 in doubles, reached on 7 March 2022. Up to date, she has won one doubles title on the WTA Tour, and six singles and four doubles titles at tournaments of the ITF Circuit.

Career

Junior years
She was a semifinalist at the 2017 Wimbledon Championships girls' singles, losing to eventual runner-up Ann Li.

On the ITF Junior Circuit, Waltert had a career-high combined ranking of No. 9, achieved on 22 January 2018.

WTA Tour
Waltert made her WTA Tour main-draw debut at the 2019 Ladies Open Lausanne, where she received a wildcard for the singles and the doubles tournaments.

She won her first doubles title at the 2021 Ladies Open Lausanne, partnering Susan Bandecchi.

At the 2022 Ladies Open Lausanne, she earned her first top-10 win over world No. 7 and top seed Danielle Collins as a wildcard, saving three match points in the deciding tiebreak. By defeating Cristina Bucsa the second round, she went one step further to reach her first WTA Tour quarterfinal, where she was beaten by Serbian Olga Danilovic. As a result, she moved up into the top 150 in the rankings.
She won the 2022 Bronx Open in doubles with partner Anna Blinkova.

Performance timeline

Only main-draw results in WTA Tour (incl. Grand Slams) are included in win–loss records.

Singles
Current  after the 2023 Merida Open.

WTA career finals

Doubles: 1 (title)

ITF Circuit finals

Singles: 17 (6 titles, 11 runner–ups)

Doubles: 8 (4 titles, 4 runner–ups)

Head-to-head record

Record against top 10 players
Waltert's match record against players who have been ranked in the top 10.

  Danielle Collins 1–0
  Julia Görges 1–0

*

Wins over top-10 players

Notes

References

External links
 
 

2000 births
Living people
Swiss female tennis players
People from Chur
Sportspeople from Graubünden
21st-century Swiss women